Tyncelyn is a hamlet in the community of Lledrod, Ceredigion, Wales, which is 63.7 miles (102.5 km) from Cardiff and 172.6 miles (277.7 km) from London. Tyncelyn is represented in the Senedd by Elin Jones (Plaid Cymru) and is part of the Ceredigion constituency in the House of Commons.

References

See also 
 List of localities in Wales by population

Villages in Ceredigion